Irkutsk Time (IRKT) is the time zone eight hours ahead of UTC (UTC+08:00) and 5 hours ahead of Moscow Time (MSK+5). 

The time zone covers Buryatia and Irkutsk Oblast.

On 27 March 2011, Russia moved to year-round daylight saving time.  Instead of switching between UTC+08:00 in winter and UTC+09:00 in summer, Irkutsk Time became fixed at UTC+09:00 until 2014, when it was reset back to UTC+08:00 year-round.

See also
Time in Russia

References

Time zones
Time in Russia